Daniil Alexandrovich Strakhov (born 2 March 1976) is a Russian actor. Internationally, he is best known for his role as Vladimir Ivanovich Korf in the television series Poor Nastya, and as Captain Lisnevsky in the film Transit.

Early life and education
Daniil Strakhov was born in Moscow, He studied in an experimental "School of self-determination" of the Academy of Pedagogical Sciences (based in Moscow secondary school № 734) under the leadership of Alexander Naumovicha Tubelsky. But before entering the theater school parents hired a tutor his son - actor in Malaya Bronnaya Theatre Oleg Vavilov.

In 1993, after graduating from high school № 734 (Moscow, lilac Boulevard, 58a), Daniil entered the acting department Moscow Art Theatre School. After studying for a year-to-date avant-garde Leontiev, he transferred to the Shchukin School for a course Yevgeny Simonov.

Career
In 1996, as a student of theatrical institute, Strakhov debuted in cinema, starring in a cameo in the film-grotesque Boris Blank "Career of Arturo Ui. new version" on the play by Bertolt Brecht.

In 1997, immediately after the Higher Theater School named Boris Shchukin, the actor was invited to the Moscow Drama Theater named after Gogol in the title role in Nicholas Ableukhov performance "Petersburg" based on the novel of the Russian writer Andrei Bely. In the theater of Gogol, Daniel worked for the year 1999.

From 1999 to 2001 the actor has worked with the Mossovet Theater and the Moscow Drama Theatre under the direction of Armen Jigarkhanyan.

From 2001 to 2003 years and from 2009 to the present time, Daniil fear is an actor of the Moscow Drama Theater on Malaya Bronnaya.

In 2003-2004, Strakhov played a major role (Baron Korf) in the Russian historical telenovela Poor Nastya, which brought him popularity.

In 2006, by order of the Minister of Defense of the Russian Federation "for the education of valor, patriotism and respect for the people of the military profession", Daniil Strakhov, among the entire team of the film, was awarded the medal "For Strengthening Military Cooperation" of the Ministry of Defense of the Russian Federation for the role of lieutenant Pankratova military drama "Storm the Gates". Awards to members of the cast and crew on the eve of the Victory Day celebrations gave Defense Minister Sergei Ivanov.

Personal life 
In 2000, Daniil Strakhov married fellow actress Maria Leonova.

Filmography

Awards and nominations

References

External links 
 
 Daniil Strakhov unofficial website +

1976 births
Living people
Russian male film actors
Russian male stage actors
Russian male television actors
Russian male voice actors

Male actors from Moscow
20th-century Russian male actors

21st-century Russian male actors
Moscow Art Theatre School alumni